Erythrism or erythrochroism refers to an unusual reddish pigmentation of an animal's hair, skin, feathers, or eggshells.

Causes of erythrism include:
 Genetic mutations which cause an absence of a normal pigment and/or excessive production of others
 Diet, as in bees feeding on "bright red corn syrup" used in maraschino cherry manufacturing.

Erythrism in katydids has been occasionally observed. The coloring might be a camouflage that helps some members of the species survive on red plants. There is also consensus that the erythristic mutation is actually a dominant trait among katydid species, albeit a disadvantageous one, due to the overwhelmingly green coloration of most foliage. Hence, most pink or otherwise vividly colored katydids do not survive to adulthood, and this observation explains their rarity. Erythrism in leopards is rare, but one study reported that two of twenty-eight leopards seen in camera traps in a South African nature reserve were erythristic, and the authors found records of five other "strawberry" leopards from the region.

Gallery

See also 

 Albinism
 Amelanism
 Dyschromia
 Heterochromia iridum
 Leucism
 Melanism
 Piebaldism
 Red hair
 Vitiligo
 Xanthochromism

References

External links 
 The Mystery of the Red Bees of Red Hook, The New York Times, November 30, 2010
 Rare Pink Katydid Discovered in Northern Illinois, Chicago Tribune, August 10, 2011
 Another Nice Example of Erythrism: Grasshopper, August 28, 2009
 Erythrism: Grasshopper in New Zealand, Rod Morris, 2010
 Pink Animal Amazingness , Paula Kashtan, lemondrop.com, December 18, 2008

Disturbances of pigmentation
Genetic disorders with no OMIM
Dermatologic terminology